Punawale is a fast developing suburb of Pimpri-Chinchwad. Punawale is 5 minutes distance from Pune Mumbai expressway.

Located advantageously close to Hinjawadi and its growing IT Park and the Pune Mumbai Expressway, Punawale has now emerged as the location of choice for home buyers from the Information Technology as well as manufacturing segments.

Punawale is also in close proximity to Wakad and benefits from convenient access to various hospitals, schools and shopping malls.

History
Punawale was an underdeveloped village. Prior to its development, most of the inhabitants were poor peasants practicing agriculture and wood carving, deprived of basic public services. From the late 1990s, the village grew to catch up with the vast industrialization and expansion of the nearby Pune city. The introduction of IT Park near Hinjawadi sparked a tremendous real estate growth in the region favored by IT professionals.

Transportation
Punawale is well connected to the rest of the city by public transportation. PMPML buses shuttle across the area frequently, connecting it with other areas of the city. Sharing / private Auto Rickshaws and cabs are also available.

Education
Some primary schools and Pre-primary schools affiliated to Maharashtra state board have been developed in this locality in the past few years. Many schools affiliated to national education boards ICSE and CBSE have been established within the area limits. Some Preschools have also been developed in Punawale, such as the Colours Preschool.

References

Neighbourhoods in Pimpri-Chinchwad